Leucetta villosa is a species of calcareous sponge in the family Leucettidae, and was first described in 1999 by Gert Wörheide and John Hooper. The species epithet, villosa, comes from the Latin, villosus ("hairy"), and was given because of the "hair-like extensions on the sponge surface".

It is found in Queensland coastal waters, where occurs in waters with surface temperatures of 20 to 25° C.

References

Taxa named by Gert Wörheide
Taxa named by John Hooper (marine biologist)
Clathrinida
Animals described in 1999